A Clouded Name is a 1923 American silent drama film directed by Austin O. Huhn and starring Norma Shearer, Gladden James and Yvonne Logan.

Cast
 Norma Shearer as Marjorie Dare  
 Gladden James as Jim Allen  
 Yvonne Logan as Smiles  
 Richard Neill as Stewart Leighton  
 Charles Miller as Sam Slocum  
 Frederick Eckhart as Ben Tangleface 
 Marion Bradley as Mrs. Davenport's maid  
 Martha Langford as Mrs. Davenport

References

Bibliography
 Jack Jacobs & Myron Braum. The films of Norma Shearer. A. S. Barnes, 1976.

External links

DVD

1923 films
American silent feature films
1920s English-language films
American black-and-white films
1923 drama films
Silent American drama films
1920s American films